Annals of Indian Academy of Neurology is a peer-reviewed open-access medical journal published on behalf of the Indian Academy of Neurology. The journal publishes articles on the subjects of neurology, neuropsychiatry, and neuroimaging. It is indexed with Abstracts on Hygiene and Communicable Diseases, CAB Abstracts, Caspur, CINAHL, DOAJ, EBSCO, Excerpta Medica/EMBASE, Expanded Academic ASAP, JournalSeek, Global Health, Google Scholar, Health & Wellness Research Center, Health Reference Center Academic, Hinari, Index Copernicus, Indian Science Abstracts, IndMed, Journal Citation Reports, MANTIS, OpenJGate, PubMed, Science Citation Index Expanded, Scimago Journal Ranking, SCOLOAR, Scopus, SIIC databases, Tropical Diseases Bulletin, and Ulrich's Periodicals Directory.

See also
 Open access in India

External links 
 

Open access journals
Quarterly journals
English-language journals
Medknow Publications academic journals
Neurology journals
Academic journals associated with learned and professional societies of India